General Chang is a fictional character from the Star Trek fictional universe who was portrayed by Christopher Plummer as the central antagonist in Star Trek VI: The Undiscovered Country, a feature film released in 1991.

In The Undiscovered Country, Chang is Chancellor Gorkon's chief of staff, and subsequently serves Chancellor Azetbur. He is depicted as being an avid fan of William Shakespeare, whom he frequently quotes in the film, much to the chagrin of the Enterprise crew. The character is almost completely bald, a trait not seen among Klingons before the release of Star Trek VI. 

The Chang makeup originally included a wig appliance. However, Christopher Plummer felt removing the wig has made the character more distinct. He also asked that Chang's Klingon makeup be made less severe. Chang's attire is also unique in that an apparent eye injury is disguised with a metal eyepatch, which is attached directly to his skull by bolts bearing the Klingon emblem. Later depictions of Klingons with eye injuries, such as Deep Space Nine's Martok, had them flaunting their mutilations as battle scars.

Plummer's delivery of lines and depiction of this character has been praised in the Star Trek franchise.

Overview
In Star Trek VI: The Undiscovered Country, Chang was a well-known Klingon general who believed that "in space all warriors are cold warriors." Throughout the film he was often depicted as fierce, cunning and willing to participate in battles personally. Chang had a deep-seated hatred for the United Federation of Planets and believed that a war with them was inevitable. 

As a result, in the events described in the video game Star Trek: Klingon Academy, he created a simulated campaign against the Federation and used it to train students at an Academy for future starship commanders. This hatred eventually led him to participate in a conspiracy to thwart plans for a lasting peace between his people and the Federation.

Between the years of 2291 and 2293 in the Star Trek universe, the general played a key role in two violent Klingon power struggles. The first was when a Klingon named Kalnor led an unsuccessful coup to depose the current Chancellor. Chang attacked and crippled Kalnor's ship, but he did not destroy it. Instead, he beamed himself aboard the enemy vessel and challenged Kalnor to single combat in front of his men. Chang killed Kalnor but lost his left eye in the fight. This resulted in the eyepatch that he is seen wearing in The Undiscovered Country. 

The second conflict broke out after the Chancellor died. Kalnor's brother, Melkor, blocked the accession of Gorkon, the former chief of staff who was the legitimate successor. Melkor declared himself emperor and touched off a brutal civil war that had devastating consequences for the Klingon Empire, largely due to the usurper's treacherous and cowardly tactics. At one point, Melkor had a whole star system destroyed, rather than surrender it. He also had help from the Romulan Star Empire, another major power.

Chang fought Melkor, but he did not support Gorkon. The two men were friends, but the general was wary of Gorkon's desire for a lasting peace with the Federation. As a result, Chang hoped to keep Gorkon from becoming the next leader of the Klingon Empire. However, Chang was eventually forced to accept help from Gorkon's forces. This led to a key victory against Melkor and his Romulan allies. It also meant that Chang was honor-bound to accept Gorkon as the new Klingon leader.

Melkor was not finished. His supporters tried to trick Chang into thinking the Federation were invading. When the ruse was discovered, Chang had to make a choice: fight the fight he had waited for his whole life, or defend his people against the threat Melkor posed. He chose the latter, and Melkor was finally killed.

During the events depicted in The Undiscovered Country, the Klingon Empire faced a momentous ecological disaster in 2293, when its key energy facility exploded and polluted the homeworld's atmosphere. This crisis had the potential to put an end to the Klingon Empire. Chang's worst fears came to life when Gorkon turned to the Federation for help. The Klingon Chancellor proposed putting an end to the cold war between the two powers and dismantling several outposts in the neutral zone between both powers. Rather than see this happen, Chang joined a secret conspiracy (which would be known as the Khitomer conspiracy) of Klingon, Federation and Romulan officials to stop the peace process by any means necessary.

The first step involved the creation of a secret warship (a Bird of Prey) with a unique ability; unlike other Klingon warships, it could fire its weapons while its cloaking device was enabled. As Gorkon's new chief of staff, Chang accompanied the Chancellor and his daughter, Azetbur, to meet with the Federation President. They were escorted through Federation space by the USS Enterprise, under the command of Captain James T. Kirk. An admirer of Kirk, Chang met him when Chang and his entourage were invited aboard the Enterprise for dinner. The Klingon general greeted Kirk as a "fellow warrior". During the dinner, Chang inadvertently paraphrased Adolf Hitler with a comment about "breathing room", which Kirk noted.

After the Klingons returned to their ship, the conspirators struck. The modified Bird of Prey, invisible and near the Enterprise, attacked Gorkon's ship and made this look like the Federation ship was responsible. Then, two Starfleet conspirators beamed aboard Gorkon's ship, mortally wounded the Chancellor and killed several other Klingons.

Chang accused Kirk of attacking them and then tried to launch a "counterattack" with Gorkon's ship. But instead, Kirk surrendered, and both he and the ship's doctor Leonard McCoy beamed aboard Gorkon's ship. Despite McCoy's efforts, Gorkon died and Chang arrested them both. (Despite his role in orchestrating Gorkon's death, Chang seemed genuinely affected by the death of his former comrade.)

Gorkon's assassination was not enough to derail the peace process. The Federation President and Azetbur (who was the new Klingon Chancellor) were both determined to continue with this. The next meeting was set to take place at a neutral site, Camp Khitomer. The conspirators started to make plans to kill their next target: the Federation President. Meanwhile, Kirk and McCoy stood trial for Gorkon's assassination. Chang prosecuted them both and succeeded in having them both found guilty. However, the judge commuted a death sentence and sent them both to the penal asteroid Rura Penthe.

Not satisfied with this, Chang ordered the commandant of Rura Penthe to make sure Kirk and McCoy were killed during an escape attempt. However, Kirk and McCoy's escape succeeded. Kirk and McCoy were rescued by Enterprise. Knowing that his enemy would find out where the peace conference was, Chang took the modified Bird of Prey to Khitomer to wait for him.

As Chang predicted, the Enterprise arrived and tried to achieve an orbit of Khitomer. Safe from enemy fire in his invisible ship, Chang taunted Kirk and his crew with Shakespearean quotes. The Bird of Prey fired one torpedo after another, causing massive damage to the Enterprise. Another Federation ship, the Excelsior, arrived to help, but Chang only fired at it as well. For Chang, victory seemed very near. The Enterprise was very close to being destroyed, followed by its companion ship.

Suddenly, the Enterprise fired a torpedo. To Chang's surprise, the torpedo had been properly aimed at his supposedly invisible warship. The Enterprise had found a way to locate Chang's ship, by tracing its exhaust. Chang and his bridge crew were killed when a reconfigured gas-sampling torpedo hit. The Enterprise and Excelsior destroyed the Bird of Prey. Realizing he was beaten, Chang uttered his last Shakespeare quote: "To be, or not to be." Members of the Enterprise crew were then able to transport to Khitomer and stop the conspirators from shooting the Federation President. The resulting conference led to a peace that lasted almost a century — exactly the thing that Chang was trying to prevent.

Reception 
In 2013, Rolling Stone magazine ranked Chang the 9th best villain of the Star Trek franchise, praising the performance of actor Christopher Plummer.

Time magazine rated General Chang the second best villain of the Star Trek franchise in 2016. In 2019, SyFy rated General Chang as the 8th greatest Klingon of the Star Trek franchise. In particular they note Plummer's brilliant delivery of lines, and an exceptional Klingon court scene with Captain Kirk (played by William Shatner) and Doctor McCoy (DeForest Kelley).

See also
 Errand of Mercy (a television episode which aired in March 1967, introducing the Klingon aliens in Star Trek)

References

External links

Television characters introduced in 1991
Fictional characters missing an eye
Fictional generals
Klingons
Star Trek (film franchise) characters